Elizabeth Seton Academy was a Roman Catholic high school for girls located in the Dorchester neighborhood of Boston, Massachusetts.

Background
The school is named for St. Elizabeth Ann Seton.

Notes and references

External links

Girls' schools in Massachusetts
Roman Catholic Archdiocese of Boston
High schools in Boston
Catholic secondary schools in Massachusetts